The Sahrawi Arab Democratic Republic (SADR) claims the Western Sahara, a territory largely administered by Morocco since Spain abandoned it in 1975. The sovereignty over Western Sahara is unresolved: the territory is contested by Morocco and Polisario Front (Popular Front for the Liberation of the Saguia el Hamra and Rio de Oro), which in February 1976 formally proclaimed a government-in-exile of the SADR. The United Nations, which considers Western Sahara a non-decolonized territory, is attempting to hold a referendum on the issue through the mission Minurso. The UN-administered cease-fire had been in effect September 1991- November 2020.

The SADR elects a legislature, the Sahrawi National Council (SNC), on a national level. The SNC, which is also referred to as the republic's parliament, has 51 members, elected after the General Popular Congress (GPC) of the Polisario Front. The 2012 election for the Sahrawi National Council took place between 19 February and 21 February 2012, with Khatri Addouh being reelected Speaker of the Council on 28 February. Elections take place within the framework of the Polisario Front, candidates are elected individually and no other political parties are allowed. The 13th GPC was held in Tifariti in the so-called Free Zone between 15 December and 22 December 2011. The GPC also elects the National Secretariat, an executive organ of the Polisario, and its Secretary-General, who then becomes President of the Sahrawi Arab Democratic Republic. Present Secretary-General is Brahim Gali. Local and regional officials, and delegates to the GPC, are elected at biannual Popular Congresses (or Popular Base Congresses) in the refugee camps in Tindouf Province, Algeria.

The constitution of the SADR, proclaimed in 1976 and last amended in 1996, stipulates that the above-described system is an emergency mechanism. If the objective of the creation of an independent Western Saharan state is attained, a transformational period defined in the constitution will begin, ending with the installment of a multi-party system on European parliamentary  lines. The Polisario will then be dissolved or transformed into an ordinary political party.

See also
Politics of the Sahrawi Arab Democratic Republic

References

 
Politics of the Sahrawi Arab Democratic Republic